Rick L. Eddins is a former Republican member of the North Carolina General Assembly, who represented the state's fortieth House district, including constituents in Wake County, for six terms (1995–2006). A business owner from Raleigh, North Carolina, Eddins was defeated for renomination to another term in the May 2, 2006 Republican primary by Marilyn Avila. He published a memoir, Call Me a Countrypolitan, in 2008.

Electoral history

2006

2004

2002

2000

References

External links
Press release: Call Me a Countrypolitan by Rick Eddins

|-

Living people
Year of birth missing (living people)
People from Raleigh, North Carolina
Politicians from Raleigh, North Carolina
20th-century American politicians
21st-century American politicians
Republican Party members of the North Carolina House of Representatives